The 1997 Women's Hockey Champions Trophy was the 6th edition of the Hockey Champions Trophy for women. It was held between 1–8 June 1997 in Berlin, Germany. From this edition on a win was rewarded with three points instead of two, and a draw with one point.

Australia won the tournament for the fourth consecutive time after defeating Germany 2–1 in the final with a golden goal.

Teams
The participating teams were determined by International Hockey Federation (FIH):

 (defending champions, champions of 1996 Summer Olympics and 1994 World Cup)
 (host nation)
 (second in 1996 Summer Olympics)
 (third in 1996 Summer Olympics)
 (fourth in 1996 Summer Olympics)
 (fifth in 1996 Summer Olympics)

Squads

Head Coach: Ric Charlesworth

Jenn Morris (c)
Katrina Powell
Michelle Andrews
Karen Smith
Renita Garard
Katie Allen
Kate Starre
Rechelle Hawkes (c)
Claire Mitchell-Taverner
Louise Dobson
Tammy Cole
Alyson Annan
Nikki Mott
Juliet Haslam
Clover Maitland (GK)
Rachel Imison (GK)

Head Coach: Berti Rauth

Alexandra Schmidt (GK)
Julia Zwehl (GK)
Susanne Müller
Tanja Dickenscheid
Nadine Ernsting-Krienke
Inga Möller
Natascha Keller
Melanie Cremer
Denise Klecker
Badri Latif
Birgit Mensch
Britta Becker
Marion Rodewald
Philippa Suxdorf
Heike Lätzsch
Katrin Kauschke (c)

Hilary Rose (GK)
Carolyn Reid (GK)
Sarah Blanks
Kirsty Bowden
Karen Brown
Lisa Copeland
Tina Cullen
Mandy Davies (c)
Jackie Empson
Denise Marston-Smith
Purdy Miller
Joanne Mould
Lucy Newcombe
Jane Smith
Jane Sixsmith
Lucilla Wright

Head Coach: Tom van 't Hek

Stella de Heij (GK)
Daphne Touw (GK)
Inge van den Broek
Julie Deiters
Ellen Kuipers
Myrna Veenstra
Nicole Koolen
Dillianne van den Boogaard
Willemijn Duyster
Hanneke Smabers
Ageeth Boomgaardt
Wendy Fortuin
Eefke Mulder
Carole Thate (c)
Fleur van de Kieft
Suzan van der Wielen

You Jae-sook (GK)
Kim Eun-jin
Cho Eun-jung (c)
Park Ok-nam
Choi Eun-kyung
Kim Myung-ok
Back Young-ok
Choi Kwan-sook
Choi Mi-soon
Lee Ji-young
Kim Soo-jung
Lee Kyung-ahn
Oh Seung-shin
Park Eun-kyung
Lee Eun-young
Jim Deok-san (GK)

Head Coach: Pam Hixon

Jennifer Salisbury
Carla Tagliente
Liz Tchou
Margaret Storrar (GK)
Meredith Thorpe
Chris DeBow
Kristen Holmes
Kelli James
Tracey Fuchs
Carolyn Schwarz
Katie Kauffman
Andrea Wieland (GK)
Rose Aspelin
Pam Neiss
Jill Reeve (c)
Tara Maguire

Umpires
Below are the 10 umpires appointed by the International Hockey Federation:

Judith Barnersby (AUS)
Renée Chatas (USA)
Gill Clarke (GBR)
Renée Cohen (NED)
Carola Heinrichs (GER)
Masako Kamisuki (JPN)
Lee Mi-ok (KOR)
Ute Löwenstein-Conen (GER)
Gina Spitaleri (ITA)

Results
All times are Central European Summer Time (UTC+02:00)

Pool

Classification

Fifth and sixth place

Third and fourth place

Final

Statistics

Final standings

Goalscorers

References

External links
Official FIH website

1997
1997 in women's field hockey
International women's field hockey competitions hosted by Germany
field hockey
Hockey
1997 in Berlin
June 1997 sports events in Europe
Women in Berlin